Kari Härkönen (born 16 July 1959) is a Finnish former cross-country skier who competed during the early 1980s. He won two medals at the FIS Nordic World Ski Championships with a gold in the 15 km in 1985 and a bronze in the 4 × 10 km relay (1982, shared with East Germany). He was born in Ristijärvi.

Härkönen also finished 13th in the 15 km event at the 1984 Winter Olympics in Sarajevo.

Cross-country skiing results
All results are sourced from the International Ski Federation (FIS).

Olympic Games

World Championships
 2 medals – (1 gold, 1 bronze)

World Cup

Season standings

Individual podiums
1 victory 
2 podiums

Team podiums
 1 podium

Note:   Until the 1999 World Championships, World Championship races were included in the World Cup scoring system.

References

External links 

1959 births
Living people
People from Ristijärvi
Finnish male cross-country skiers
Cross-country skiers at the 1980 Winter Olympics
Cross-country skiers at the 1984 Winter Olympics
FIS Nordic World Ski Championships medalists in cross-country skiing
Olympic cross-country skiers of Finland
Sportspeople from Kainuu
20th-century Finnish people